Lahad Datu is a federal constituency in Tawau Division (Kunak District and Lahad Datu District) and Sandakan Division (Kinabatangan District), Sabah, Malaysia, that has been represented in the Dewan Rakyat since 2019 was renamed from Silam.

The federal constituency was created in the 2019 redistribution and is mandated to return a single member to the Dewan Rakyat under the first past the post voting system.

Demographics 
https://ge15.orientaldaily.com.my/seats/sabah/p

History

Polling districts 
According to the gazette issued on 31 October 2022, the Lahad Datu constituency has a total of 31 polling districts.

Representation history

State constituency

Current state assembly members

Local governments

Election results

References

Sabah federal constituencies